Sunset Sound Recorders is a recording studio in Hollywood, California, United States located at 6650 Sunset Boulevard.

Background
The Sunset Sound Recorders complex was created by Walt Disney's Director of Recording, Tutti Camarata, from a collection of old commercial and residential buildings. At the encouragement of Disney himself, Camarata began the project in 1958, starting with a former automotive repair garage whose sloping floor would tend to reduce unwanted sonic standing wave reflections. Soon, the audio for many of Disney's early films was being recorded at the studio, including Bedknobs and Broomsticks, Mary Poppins, and 101 Dalmatians

Over 200 Gold records have been recorded at Sunset Sound, including hit albums for Elton John, Led Zeppelin, Van Halen, Toto, parts of Prince's Purple Rain, the Rolling Stones' Exile on Main St., the Beach Boys' Pet Sounds, Linda Ronstadt's Don't Cry Now, parts of Guns N' Roses' Chinese Democracy and Janis Joplin's posthumously-released Pearl. In addition, the Doors recorded their first two albums, The Doors and Strange Days, at the studio. Idina Menzel recorded her vocal track for the song "Let It Go" for Disney Animation's 2013 film Frozen at the studio.

In 1981, Sunset Sound Recorders owner Camarata purchased The Sound Factory, another Los Angeles recording studio founded by Moonglow Records and later purchased and developed by David Hassinger.  The two studios now operate as Sunset Sound and The Sound Factory, respectively.

References

External links

 
 2019 video tour of Sunset Sound by engineer Warren Huart
 Archive of 2009 Sunset Sound and Sound Factory website

Recording studios in California
Audio engineering
Music of Los Angeles
Sunset Boulevard (Los Angeles)
Companies based in Los Angeles
Entertainment companies based in California
 01